Paul Reed may refer to:
P. Booker Reed (1842–1913), mayor of Louisville, Kentucky
Paul Reed (artist) (1919–2015), American artist
Paul Reed (basketball) (born 1999), American basketball player
Paul Reed (actor) (1909–2007), American actor
Paul Reed (writer) (1956–2002), American writer
Paul Reed Smith (born 1956), luthier and founder of PRS Guitars

See also
Paul Reid (disambiguation)
Paul Read (disambiguation)